Spinacetin is an O-methylated flavonol. It can be found in spinach (Spinacia oleracea).

References 

O-methylated flavonols
Resorcinols